Gerald W. Zamponi is a Canadian physiologist and pharmacologist, currently a Canada Research Chair in Molecular Neuroscience at University of Calgary.

References

Year of birth missing (living people)
Living people
Academic staff of the University of Calgary
Canadian physiologists
Canadian pharmacologists
Canada Research Chairs